The Children of Soong Ching Ling is a 1984 Canadian short documentary film directed by Gary Bush. It was nominated for an Academy Award for Best Documentary Short. It is about the humanitarian work in support of children by Mrs. Soong Ching-ling, or Madame Sun Yat-sen. In particular the short film features an orphanage she sponsored.

References

External links
The Children of Soong Ching Ling at Pyramid Media

1984 films
1980s short documentary films
Canadian short documentary films
Documentary films about the Republic of China (1912–1949)
Documentary films about orphanages
Sun Yat-sen
1980s English-language films
1980s Canadian films